Pueblo is a barrio in the municipality of Lares, Puerto Rico. Its population in 2010 was 4,838.

Sectors
Barrios (which are roughly comparable to minor civil divisions) and subbarrios, in turn, are further subdivided into smaller local populated place areas/units called sectores (sectors in English). The types of sectores may vary, from normally sector to urbanización to reparto to barriada to residencial, among others.

The following sectors are in Pueblo barrio:

, and 
.

Sector Seburuquillo waited nearly three weeks to receive aid after Hurricane Maria destroyed infrastructure, leaving 80 families without food and water or communication.

See also

 List of communities in Puerto Rico
 List of barrios and sectors of Lares, Puerto Rico

References

Barrios of Lares, Puerto Rico